The inaugural elections to North-East Fife Council were held in May 1974, the same day as the other Scottish local government elections.

Election results

Ward results

References

1974 Scottish local elections
1974